Sabine Eggerth (9 June 1943 – 28 January 2017) was a German film and television actress. Eggerth was a child actor who made her debut aged ten in Anna Louise and Anton (1953). She played the title role in the 1955 film His Daughter is Called Peter. In the 1960s she switched to playing grown-up roles in television series.

She married the film director Rolf von Sydow.

Selected filmography
 Anna Louise and Anton (1953)
 Maxie (1954)
 His Daughter is Called Peter (1955)
 As Long as the Roses Bloom (1956)
 That's No Way to Land a Man (1959)
 Salto Mortale (1969–1972, TV series)

References

Bibliography 
 Fritsche, Maria. Homemade Men in Postwar Austrian Cinema: Nationhood, Genre and Masculinity. Berghahn Books, 2013.

External links 
 

1943 births
2017 deaths
German film actresses
German television actresses
German child actresses